Andrew Greta (born August 1969) is an author, business executive, finance professional and a current vice president at Busey Bank.

Life
In 2011, Greta wrote I Am John Galt: Today's Heroic Innovators Building the World and the Villainous Parasites Destroying It with co-author Donald L. Luskin. The 307-page book was published in May of that year by John Wiley & Sons.

Greta was formerly Director, Business Development at CME Group in Chicago and was previously General Manager, Asset Intelligence for GE Equipment Services in Stamford, Connecticut. He is a former contributing editor for TheStreet.com. His articles on finance and investing have appeared in numerous national publications including SFO Magazine, DSNews.com, ABCNews.com, Online Investor, and Individual Investor.

Greta holds an MBA with a concentration in Finance from Purdue University’s Krannert Graduate School of Management. He is a former associate director of the University of Illinois at Urbana-Champaign's student-run Illinois Business Consulting and sits as a member of the board of directors for the Krannert School Alumni Association.

References 

University of Illinois Urbana-Champaign people
American business executives
Living people
1969 births